Englefield may refer to:

Geography
In England:
 Englefield, Berkshire, a village in the county of Berkshire, England
 Englefield Green, a village in the county of Surrey, England

In Wales:
 Englefield, an alternative name for the Cantref of Tegeingl in north Wales

Sport
 Englefield Green Rovers F.C., an Association Football club based in Englefield Green

Other
 Englefield (surname)
 Englefield Lodge, the first substantial home of Guise Brittan in Christchurch, New Zealand
 Englefield, East Maitland, a heritage-listed former inn and now residence at 49 Newcastle Street, East Maitland